The following is a page of episodes for the television sitcom My Wife and Kids. The series aired on ABC from March 28, 2001, to May 17, 2005, with a total of 123 episodes produced spanning 5 seasons.

Series overview

Episodes

Season 1 (2001)

Season 2 (2001–02)

Season 3 (2002–03)

Season 4 (2003–04)

Season 5 (2004–05)

External links
 

Lists of American sitcom episodes

it:Episodi di Tutto in famiglia (prima stagione)